A National Olympic Committee (NOC) may enter up to 2 athlete per gender. There is a maximum of 64 competitors allowed (32 per gender).

Qualification summary

Men

Women

 While the Netherlands Antilles originally qualified, they declined participation and were replaced by Peru.

See also
Bowling at the 2011 Pan American Games

References

Qualification for the 2011 Pan American Games
Bowling at the 2011 Pan American Games